Eiresidae or Eiresidai was a deme of ancient Attica, west or southwest of Cephisia, and adjacent to Iphistiadae.

The site of Eiresidae is located west of modern Kolonos.

References

Populated places in ancient Attica
Former populated places in Greece
Demoi